35th London Film Critics Circle Awards
17 January 2016

Film of the Year: 
Mad Max: Fury Road

British Film of the Year: 
45 Years

The 36th London Film Critics' Circle Awards, honouring the best in film for 2015, were announced by the London Film Critics' Circle on 17 January 2016.

Winners and nominees

Film of the Year
Mad Max: Fury Road
45 Years
Amy
Carol
Inside Out
The Look of Silence
The Martian
The Revenant
Room
Spotlight

Foreign Language Film of the Year
The Look of Silence
Eden
Hard to Be a God
The Tale of the Princess Kaguya
The Tribe

British/Irish Film of the Year
45 Years
Amy
Brooklyn
The Lobster
London Road

Documentary of the Year
Amy
Going Clear: Scientology and the Prison of Belief
The Look of Silence
Palio
A Syrian Love Story

Actor of the Year
Tom Courtenay – 45 Years
Paul Dano – Love & Mercy
Leonardo DiCaprio – The Revenant
Michael Fassbender – Steve Jobs
Tom Hardy – Legend

Actress of the Year
Charlotte Rampling – 45 Years
Cate Blanchett – Carol
Brie Larson – Room
Rooney Mara – Carol
Saoirse Ronan – Brooklyn

Supporting Actor of the Year
Mark Rylance – Bridge of Spies
Benicio del Toro – Sicario
Tom Hardy – The Revenant
Oscar Isaac – Ex Machina
Michael Keaton – Spotlight

Supporting Actress of the Year
Kate Winslet – Steve Jobs
Olivia Colman – The Lobster
Kristen Stewart – Clouds of Sils Maria
Tilda Swinton – Trainwreck
Alicia Vikander – Ex Machina

British/Irish Actor of the Year
Tom Hardy – Legend, London Road, Mad Max: Fury Road, and The Revenant 
Michael Caine – Kingsman: The Secret Service and Youth
Idris Elba – Beasts of No Nation and Second Coming
Colin Farrell – The Lobster and Miss Julie
Michael Fassbender – Macbeth, Slow West, and Steve Jobs

British/Irish Actress of the Year
Saoirse Ronan – Brooklyn and Lost River
Emily Blunt – Sicario
Carey Mulligan – Far From the Madding Crowd and Suffragette
Charlotte Rampling – 45 Years and The Forbidden Room
Kate Winslet – The Dressmaker, A Little Chaos, and Steve Jobs

Young British/Irish Performer of the Year
Maisie Williams – The Falling
Asa Butterfield – X+Y
Milo Parker – Mr. Holmes and Robot Overlords
Florence Pugh – The Falling
Liam Walpole – The Goob

Director of the Year
George Miller – Mad Max: Fury Road
Andrew Haigh – 45 Years
Todd Haynes – Carol
Alejandro G. Iñárritu – The Revenant
Ridley Scott – The Martian

Screenwriter of the Year
Tom McCarthy and Josh Singer – Spotlight
Emma Donoghue – Room
Nick Hornby – Brooklyn
Phyllis Nagy – Carol
Aaron Sorkin – Steve Jobs

Breakthrough British/Irish Filmmaker
John Maclean – Slow West
Tom Browne – Radiator
Mark Burton and Richard Starzak – Shaun the Sheep Movie
Emma Donoghue – Room
Alex Garland – Ex Machina

British/Irish Short Film
Benjamin Cleary – Stutterer
Fyzal Boulifa – Rate Me
Jorn Threlfall – Over
Simon Mesa Soto – Leidi
Duncan Cowles – Directed by Tweedie

Technical Achievement
Carol – Edward Lachman, cinematography
Carol – Carter Burwell, music
Cinderella – Sandy Powell, costumes
Ex Machina – Andrew Whitehurst, visual effects
Macbeth – Alistair Sirkett and Markus Stemler, sound design
Mad Max: Fury Road – Colin Gibson, production design
Mad Max: Fury Road – John Seale, cinematography
Mission: Impossible – Rogue Nation – Wade Eastwood, stunts
Sicario – Tom Ozanich, sound design
Steve Jobs – Elliot Graham, editing

Dilys Powell Award
Kenneth Branagh

References

2
2015 film awards
2015 in British cinema
2015 in London
January 2016 events in the United Kingdom